The Rutland Senate District is one of 16 districts of the Vermont Senate. The current district plan is included in the redistricting and reapportionment plan developed by the Vermont General Assembly following the 2020 U.S. Census, which applies to legislatures elected in 2022, 2024, 2026, 2028, and 2030.

The Rutland District includes all of Rutland County except the town of Mount Holly, which is in the Windsor district.

As of the 2010 census, the state as a whole had a population of 625,741. As there are a total of 30 Senators, there were 20,858 residents per senator.

District Senators

As of 2022
Brian Collamore, Republican
Dave Weeks, Republican
Terry Williams, Republican
2005-2006
 Hull P. Maynard, Jr., Republican
 Kevin J. Mullin, Republican
 Wendy L. Wilton, Republican

2007-2008

 Bill Carris, Democrat
 Hull P. Maynard, Jr., Republican
 Kevin J. Mullin, Republican

As of 2017

 Brian Collamore, Republican
 Peg Flory, Republican
 Kevin J. Mullin, Republican

Candidates for 2022
The following information was obtained from the Vermont Secretary of State website.

Towns and cities in the Rutland District, 2012–2022 elections

Rutland County 
Benson
Brandon
Castleton
Chittenden
Clarendon
Danby
Fair Haven
Hubbardton
Ira
Killington
Mendon
Middletown Springs
Mount Tabor
Pawlet
Pittsfield
Pittsford
Poultney
Proctor
Rutland
Rutland Town
Shrewsbury
Sudbury
Tinmouth
Wallingford
Wells
West Haven
West Rutland

Towns and cities in the Rutland District, 2002–2012 elections

Rutland County 

 Benson
 Castleton
 Chittenden
 Clarendon
 Danby
 Fair Haven
 Hubbardton
 Ira
 Killington
 Mendon
 Middletown Springs
 Mount Holly
 Mount Tabor
 Pawlet
 Pittsfield
 Pittsford
 Poultney
 Proctor
 Rutland
 Rutland Town
 Shrewsbury
 Sudbury
 Tinmouth
 Wallingford
 Wells
 West Haven
 West Rutland

See also 
Rutland Vermont Senate District, 2002-2012
Vermont Senate districts, 2012–2022

References

External links

 Redistricting information from Vermont Legislature
 2002 and 2012 Redistricting information from Vermont Legislature
 Map of Vermont Senate districts and statistics (PDF) 2002–2012

Rutland County, Vermont
Vermont Senate districts